McConaghy is a surname. Notable people with the surname include:

 Brian McConaghy (born 1950), Canadian forensic scientist
 Jack McConaghy (1902–1977), American set decorator
 Lorraine McConaghy (21st century), American historian
 Stephen McConaghy (born 1968), Australian sailor